Pic du Frêne (2,807 m) is a mountain in the Belledonne Massif in Savoie, France.

Mountains of Savoie
Mountains of the Alps